Superior ganglion can refer to:
 Superior ganglion of glossopharyngeal nerve
 Superior ganglion of vagus nerve
 Superior cervical ganglion